Infibeam Avenues Limited is an Indian payment infrastructure and software as a service (SaaS) fintech company that provides digital payment services, eCommerce platforms, digital lending, data cloud storage and omnichannel enterprise software to businesses across industries in India and globally.

Through its flagship brand, CCAvenue, the business is present in the payment infrastructure market, processing more than $49 billion in online payments. Infibeam Avenues claims to have more than 6.4 million merchants on its platform. It also operates in overseas markets like the USA, KSA, UAE, and Australia.

It is headquartered in GIFT City, Gujarat, India with offices in Delhi, Mumbai and Bengaluru.

History 
Ex-Amazon executive Vishal Mehta, a Cornell University and MIT graduate, decided to return to India in 2007 and founded Infibeam. The company was started with an initial capital of 10-15 crore. 

Infibeam Avenues was listed on the BSE and the NSE in 2016.

Infibeam provides its marketplace software platform, BAB, to two of India's four largest eCommerce organisations – GeM and JioMart.

On September 7, 2022, Infibeam Avenues launched its omni-channel mobile app CCAvenue TapPay that allows businesses and entrepreneurs to convert any NFC-enabled Android phone into smart PoS terminals.

Services

Payment Processing 
Infibeam’s flagship brand CCAvenue provides digital payment gateway service. CCAvenue Payment Gateway provides multiple payment options and is available in 18 different languages and collects payments in 27 major foreign currencies. CCAvenue also provides a secure link between websites, institutions, and banks in the transaction.

CCAvenue’s 'TokenPay' help merchants to comply with Reserve Bank of India's data security norms by securing multi-network tokenisation, which works across major card networks, including MasterCard, RuPay, and Visa.

Merchants Financing/Lending 
Infibeam Avenue Ltd has lending aggregating platform -Trust Avenue. The company did AI-based lending for 3 million merchants through tie-ups with banks and NBFCs.

Enterprise ecommerce software platform 
Infibeam Avenues' enterprise ecommerce software platform BuildaBazaar hosts India's largest online marketplace for government procurement. The company also entered into a definitive agreement with Jio Platforms to offer its enterprise software licence and enterprise digital payments platform to Jio Platforms and its associates for their internal businesses.

On November 20, 2017, Infibeam Avenues launched BillAvenue, an inter-operable digital bill payments platform built over the Bharat Bill Payment System (BBPS) infrastructure to enable service providers to accept bill payments from customers nationwide, through both online and offline channels.

Data Centre infrastructure services
The company forayed into the segment of infrastructure or data centre-as-a-service, and built a state-of-the-art Tier-III data centre in GIFT City, Gandhinagar. It received Tier-III design certification from Uptime Institute as it is equipped with fully redundant and dual-powered servers, storage, network links and other IT components. Infibeam Avenues has partnered with IBM India to develop implement and promote blockchain capabilities on the LinuxOne platform, the first of its kind in India.

Mergers & Acquisitions

Partnership

Awards and recognition 
In February 2018, Infibeam was ranked 418th in The Financial Times and Statista's FT1000 High Growth Companies Asia - Pacific 2018.
ET BFSI Excellence Awards 2022

References 

Companies based in Ahmedabad
Indian companies established in 2007
Online financial services companies of India
Retail companies established in 2007
Technology companies established in 2007
Companies listed on the National Stock Exchange of India
Companies listed on the Bombay Stock Exchange